Siân Rees is a British author and historian. She was born in Cornwall, has a degree in history from University of Oxford and lives in France. She is particularly interested in the social and maritime history of the 17th and 18th centuries. Her first book, about the transportation of female convicts to Australia at the end of the 18th century, was made into a Timewatch documentary and has been optioned as a feature film. The second, a biography of Eliza Lynch, led to her involvement in the Argentine documentary Candido Lopez: Los Campos de Batalla, directed by José Luis García.

Her books have been published in over fifteen countries and she is represented by the London literary agent Andrew Lownie.

Bibliography
 The Floating Brothel: The Extraordinary Story of the Lady Julian and its Cargo of Female Convicts Bound for Botany Bay, Hodder (2001), 
 The Shadows of Elisa Lynch: How a Nineteenth-century Irish Courtesan Became the Most Powerful Woman in Paraguay, Headline (2003) 
 The Ship Thieves: The True Tale of James Porter, Colonial Pirate, Aurum (2006) 
 Sweet Water and Bitter: the Ships that Stopped the Slave Trade, New Hampshire (2011)  
 Moll: The Life and Times of Moll Flanders, Chatto & Windus (2011)

References

External links
 Review of The Floating Brothel
 When Irish eyes were smiling (Review)
 Sweet Water and Bitter: The Ships that Stopped the Slave Trade (Review)

Year of birth missing (living people)
Living people
English historians
Writers from Cornwall
Alumni of the University of Oxford